Events in 1957 in animation.

Events

January
 January 5: Friz Freleng's Three Little Bops, produced by Warner Bros. Cartoons, is first released.

February
 February 9: Chuck Jones' Ali Baba Bunny, produced by Warner Bros. Cartoons and starring Bugs Bunny and Daffy Duck, is first released.

March
 March 20: The film Hemo the Magnificent, a combination of live-action with animated sequences, premieres.
 March 27: 29th Academy Awards: The Mr. Magoo cartoon Magoo's Puddle Jumper wins the Academy Award for Best Animated Short Film.

May
 May 2-17: 1957 Cannes Film Festival: The documentary film City of Gold by Colin Low and Wolf Koenig which also features animated segments, wins the Palme d'or for Best Documentary Short.
 May 4: Bob McKimson's Cheese It, the Cat! is first released, produced by Warner Bros. Cartoons. It's a parody of the TV show The Honeymooners.
 May 15: The Metro-Goldwyn-Mayer cartoon studio closes down.

July
 July 6: Chuck Jones' Bugs Bunny short What's Opera, Doc? premieres, produced by Warner Bros. Cartoons, starring Bugs Bunny and Elmer Fudd. Though not remarkably popular at first, it will eventually become one of the most famous and critically acclaimed animated cartoons of all time.
 July 7: William Hanna, Joseph Barbera and George Sidney establish their own TV animation studio Hanna-Barbera.

August
 August 28: Wolfgang Reitherman's The Truth About Mother Goose, produced by Walt Disney Animation Studios, premieres.
 August 31: Friz Freleng's Bugsy and Mugsy, produced by Warner Bros. Cartoons and starring Bugs Bunny, Rocky and Mugsy, is first released.

October
 October 3: The first episode of The Woody Woodpecker Show is broadcast.

November
 November 1: Lev Atamanov and Nikolay Fyodorov's The Snow Queen is first released.
 November 2: Friz Freleng's Show Biz Bugs, starring Bugs Bunny and Daffy Duck, is first released.
 November 28: The first episode of Hergé's Adventures of Tintin by Ray Goossens and animation studio Belvision, airs on television. This is the first hand-drawn animated television adaptation of the comics series The Adventures of Tintin by Hergé.

December
 December 14: 
 Bob McKimson's Rabbit Romeo premieres, produced by Warner Bros. Cartoons, starring Bugs Bunny. The short was released on December 14, 1957, and stars Bugs Bunny and Elmer Fudd.
 The first Hanna-Barbera animated television series airs on American television: The Ruff and Reddy Show.

Specific date unknown
 Zdeněk Miler launches his animated television series The Little Mole.
 Colonel Bleep, the first animated TV series in colour debuts.
 The animated musical advertisement Let's All Go to the Lobby, directed by Dave Fleischer, is first played in theaters. It plays before intermissions in theaters.

Films released 

 January 20 - The Big Fun Carnival (United States)
 March 20 - Hemo the Magnificent (United States)
 December 31 - The Snow Queen (Soviet Union)

Television series 

 June 10 - Tom Terrific debuts in syndication.
 August 22 - Captain Pugwash debuts on BBC.
 October 3 - The Woody Woodpecker Show debuts on ABC.
 December 14 - The Ruff and Reddy Show debuts on NBC.
 Specific date unknown - Colonel Bleep debuts in syndication.

Births

January
 January 5: Charlie Brissette, American singer (voice of various characters in The Ren & Stimpy Show, Singer in the Time Squad episode "Recruitment Ad", choir performer in The Angry Beavers), composer (Nickelodeon Animation Studio, Sitting Ducks, composed and performed the theme for Pet Alien), songwriter (The Ren & Stimpy Show) and arranger (Sesame Street).
 January 11: Andrey Ignatenko, Russian animator (The Tale of Tsar Saltan, The Adventures of Lolo the Penguin, Varga Studio), (d. 2021).
 January 12: John Lasseter, American animator, screenwriter, producer, and director (Walt Disney Animation Studios, Pixar, Skydance Animation).
 January 15: David Pruiksma, American animator (Walt Disney Animation Studios), storyboard artist, writer and director (Hi Hi Puffy AmiYumi).
 January 16: Joey Camen, American voice actor (voice of Natural Smurf in The Smurfs, Stegmutt in Darkwing Duck, Greg Egan in Eureka Seven, Chris Carter in Creepy Crawlers).
 January 25: Jenifer Lewis, American actress (voice of Mama Odie in The Princess and the Frog, Flo in the Cars franchise, Bebe Ho in The PJs, Professor Granville in Big Hero 6: The Series, Patty in The Ghost and Molly McGee).
 January 29: Diane Delano, American actress (voice of Ma Vreedle in the Ben 10 franchise, Pantha in Teen Titans, Big Barda in Batman: The Brave and the Bold).

February
 February 1: Renae Jacobs, American voice actress (voice of April O'Neil in Teenage Mutant Ninja Turtles).
 February 6: Kathy Najimy, American actress (voice of Peggy Hill in King of the Hill, Madame Blanche in Hey Arnold!, Taqqiq in Brother Bear 2, Coach Doogan and Margot LeSandre in Pepper Ann, continued voice of Mrs. Shapiro in Little Bill).
 February 10: Sally Dryer, American voice actress (voice of Violet, Lucy Van Pelt, and Patty in the Peanuts franchise).
 February 16: LeVar Burton, American actor (voice of Kwame in Captain Planet and the Planeteers and the OK K.O.! Let's Be Heroes episode "The Power Is Yours", Anansi in Gargoyles, Dr. Consilium in Miles from Tomorrowland, Doc Greene in Transformers: Rescue Bots, Black Lightning in Superman/Batman: Public Enemies, Rhodey Rhodes / War Machine in The Super Hero Squad Show episode "Tales of Suspense!", himself in the Family Guy episode "Not All Dogs Go to Heaven").
 February 25: Miroslaw Zbrojewicz, Polish actor (Polish dub voice of Mr. Krabs in SpongeBob SquarePants, Mr. Freeze and Hal Jordan in The Batman, John Stewart in Justice League and Justice League Unlimited, Einstein in Oliver & Company).
 February 27: 
 Danny Antonucci, Canadian animator, director, producer, and writer (creator of Ed, Edd n Eddy, The Brothers Grunt, and Lupo the Butcher).
 Kevin Curran, American television writer and producer (The Simpsons), (d. 2016).

March
 March 3: David Shaughnessy, English actor (voice of Heathcliff in Big Hero 6: The Series, Cates in The Tom and Jerry Show, Msamaki in Cleopatra in Space, Gentleman Starkey in Peter Pan & the Pirates, Drell in Star Wars Resistance, Aresko in Star Wars Rebels, Ulysses Klaue in Avengers Assemble, Etrigan in the Young Justice episode "Nomed Esir!").
 March 5: Bridget Hoffman, American actress (voice of Lain Iwakura in Serial Experiments Lain, Nia Teppelin in Gurren Lagann, Irisveil von Einzbern in Fate/Zero, Yukari Takara in Lucky Star, Ryoko Asakura in Haruhi Suzumiya, Crystal in ParaNorman).
 March 6: Eddie Deezen, American actor and comedian (portrayed himself in the SpongeBob SquarePants episode "Truth or Square", voice of Know-It-All Kid in The Polar Express, Mandark in Dexter's Laboratory, Snipes in Rock-a-Doodle, Ham, Sam and Kam in Mother Goose and Grimm, Ringo in Eek! The Cat, Iggy Catalp in Duckman, Caliph in Scooby-Doo! in Arabian Nights, Melvin in Life with Louie, Charlie in The Brave Little Toaster to the Rescue, Andy Pumpkin in Oswald, Larry in Lloyd in Space, Ned in Kim Possible, Gibby Norton in What's New, Scooby-Doo?, Bahuka in the Timon & Pumbaa episode "Oahu Wahoo", Alvin Yasbek in the Mighty Ducks: The Animated Series episode "Mondo-Man", Tex Hardbottom in The Lionhearts episode "Brown Dog Day", the title character in The Secret Files of the Spy Dogs episode "D'Cell", Oswald in the Johnny Bravo episode "Johnny Goes to Camp", Frank Sedgwick in the Recess episode "Lord of the Nerds", Todd in the Chowder episode "Sheboodles", Carlton J. Stankmeyer in the Pound Puppies episode "The Yipper Caper", Zip in the Handy Manny episode "Hank's Birthday", Squares in the Star vs. the Forces of Evil episode "Party with a Pony", Ped in the Transformers: Robots in Disguise episode "Can You Dig It?", Cartoon Peepers in the Wander Over Yonder episode "The Cartoon", additional voices in The Pink Panther).
 March 7: Susan Odjakjian, American animator (Disney Television Animation, Warner Bros. Animation, Adventures of Sonic the Hedgehog, Captain Planet and the Planeteers, Captain N: The Game Master).
 March 11: Antonio Zurera, Spanish animator (The Charlie Brown and Snoopy Show, Asterix, Benjamin Blümchen, Bibi Blocksberg), storyboard artist (Hurricanes, Pippi Longstocking, Madeline: Lost in Paris, Courage the Cowardly Dog), writer, director and producer (Dragon Hill, la colina del dragón, The Magic Cube, RH+, the Vampire of Seville, Dragon Guardians).
 March 15:
 David Silverman, American animator (The Simpsons) and director (Monsters, Inc., The Simpsons, Extinct, Warner Bros. Animation).
 Joaquim de Almeida, Portuguese actor (voice of Bane in The Batman episode "Traction", Román Calzado in the Archer episode "El Contador", Portuguese dub voice of Tai Lung in Kung Fu Panda, El Macho in Despicable Me 2, and the Mighty Eagle in The Angry Birds Movie).
 March 20: Chris Wedge, American film director, producer, writer, animator and cartoonist (Blue Sky Studios).
 March 22: Max Pross, American television writer (The Critic, The Simpsons) and producer (The Critic, Futurama, The Simpsons, Napoleon Dynamite).
 March 23:
 Teresa Ganzel, American actress and comedienne (voice of Miss Vavoom in Tom and Jerry Kids and Droopy, Master Detective, Loulabelle in Cow & Chicken and I Am Weasel, Kitty Glitter in Top Cat and the Beverly Hills Cats, Colleen McNulty in Rugrats, Liza in Clifford's Really Big Movie).
 Amanda Plummer, American actress (voice of Clotho in the Hercules franchise, Lady Redundant Woman in WordGirl, Professor Poofenplotz in Phineas and Ferb, Princess Fallopia in the Duckman episode "The Road to Dendron").
 March 28: Paul Eiding, American actor (voice of Max Tennyson in the Ben 10 franchise, Blukic, Liam, and Eye Guy in Ben 10: Omniverse, Perceptor in The Transformers).
 March 29: Davis Doi, American animator (Marvel Productions, Garbage Pail Kids), director (The Real Adventures of Jonny Quest, SD Entertainment, The Land Before Time XIV: Journey of the Brave, Curious George) and producer (Hanna-Barbera, Care Bears: Unlock the Magic, Boy Girl Dog Cat Mouse Cheese).
 March 30: Brian Hohlfeld, American screenwriter (Winnie the Pooh, Transformers).
 March 31: Terry Klassen, Canadian voice actor (voice of Sylvester the Cat in Baby Looney Tunes, Maurice Squab in The Wacky World of Tex Avery, Milton Huxley in Mummies Alive!, Tusky Husky in Krypto the Superdog, Impossible Man in Fantastic Four: World's Greatest Heroes, Krillin in the Ocean dub of Dragon Ball Z, Von Reichter in Cybersix, various characters in Mega Man) and voice director (My Little Pony: Friendship is Magic).

April
 April 1:
 Andreas Deja, Polish-born German-American animator (Walt Disney Animation Studios).
 Bill Freiberger, American television producer, writer (The PJs, Baby Blues, The Simpsons, 3-South, Greg the Bunny, Drawn Together, Rekkit Rabbit, Sonic Boom) and voice actor (voice of Comedy Chimp and various other characters in Sonic Boom).
 April 18: Lolee Aries, American television producer and production manager (Film Roman, Nickelodeon Animation Studio, MoonScoop), (d. 2018).
 April 23: Jan Hooks, American actress and comedian (voice of Lil in Frosty Returns, Manjula Nahasapeemapetilon in The Simpsons, Angleyne in the Futurama episode "Bendless Love", Nadine in the Game Over episode "Monkey Dearest", Mrs. Kellogg in The Cleveland Show episode "Mr. & Mrs. Brown"), (d. 2014).
 April 27: Sheena Easton, Scottish singer and actress (voice of Agnes in David Copperfield, Robyn Canmore, Banshee, Molly, and Finella in Gargoyles, Groomer, Persia, and Mrs. British Prime Minister in Road Rovers, Sasha La Fleur in All Dogs Go to Heaven 2, All Dogs Go to Heaven: The Series, and An All Dogs Christmas Carol, Dr. Robin Doyle in The Legend of Tarzan, Professor Fiona Pembrooke in Scooby-Doo! and the Loch Ness Monster, Doofenshmirtz's girlfriend in the Phineas and Ferb episode "Chez Platypus", Betty in the Duckman episode "Aged Heat 2: Women in Heat", Mother Kangaroo in The Wild Thornberrys episode "Pal Joey", Trixie in The Sylvester & Tweety Mysteries episode "Yelp").

May
 May 13: Mark Heap, English actor and comedian (voice of Eric Feeble in Stressed Eric).
 May 16: Philo Barnhart, American animator (Walt Disney Animation Studios, The Smurfs, The Secret of NIMH).
 May 19: Tom Gammill, American television writer and producer (The Critic, The Simpsons, Futurama, Napoleon Dynamite).
 May 21: Judge Reinhold, American actor (voice of Larry Gablegobble in Clifford's Really Big Movie, Negative Man in the Teen Titans episode "Homecoming", Judge Reinhold in the Clerks: The Animated Series episode "A Dissertation on the American Justice System by People Who Have Never Been Inside a Courtroom, Let Alone Know Anything About the Law, but Have Seen Way Too Many Legal Thrillers").
 May 22: Ken Pontac, American television writer (Gumby Adventures, Mighty Max, Extreme Dinosaurs, The Legend of Calamity Jane, ReBoot, Sherlock Holmes in the 22nd Century, LazyTown, ¡Mucha Lucha!, ToddWorld, Happy Tree Friends, Krypto the Superdog, Pet Alien, The Secret Show, Storm Hawks, Arthur, Generator Rex, Matt Hatter Chronicles, Slugterra, Octonauts, Pac-Man and the Ghostly Adventures, Kong: King of the Apes, Curious George, Mighty Express, creator of Bump in the Night).
 May 23: Iona Morris, American actress (voice of Claudia Grant in the Robotech franchise, Medusa in Fantastic Four, Principal Stringent in ChalkZone, first voice of Storm in X-Men).
 May 29: Ted Levine, American actor (voice of Sinestro in the DC Animated Universe).

June
 June 8: Scott Adams, American author and cartoonist (creator of Dilbert).
 June 16: Ian Buchanan, Scottish actor (voice of Ultra-Humanite in Justice League, Constantine in the Gargoyles episode "Avalon", Abel Cuvier in the Batman Beyond episode "Splicers", Sherlock Holmes in the Batman: The Brave and the Bold episode "Trials of the Demon!").
 June 23: Frances McDormand, American actress (voice of Captain Chantel DuBois in Madagascar 3: Europe's Most Wanted, Momma in The Good Dinosaur, Interpreter Nelson in Isle of Dogs).

July
 July 2: Bret Hart, Canadian-American retired professional wrestler (voiced himself in The Simpsons episode "The Old Man and the Lisa").
 July 3: Billy Aronson, American playwright, production assistant (Defenders of the Earth), television producer and writer (Video Power, Space Ghost Coast to Coast, Beavis and Butt-Head, Courage the Cowardly Dog, Codename: Kids Next Door, Postcards from Buster, Wonder Pets!, The Backyardigans, Octonauts, co-creator of Peg + Cat).
 July 17: Aleksandr Petrov, Russian animator and animation director.
 July 21:
 Jon Lovitz, American actor and comedian (voice of Jay Sherman in The Critic and The Simpsons episode "A Star Is Burns", Radio in The Brave Little Toaster, T.R. Chula in An American Tail: Fievel Goes West, Tom Blazer in Eight Crazy Nights, Quasimodo in Hotel Transylvania, The Phantom of the Opera in Hotel Transylvania 2, Queen Gabnidine in the Randy Cunningham: 9th Grade Ninja episode "To Smell and Back", Sid Sharp in the Justice League Action episode "Superman's Pal, Sid Sharp").
 Sherie Pollack, American animator (Pinocchio and the Emperor of the Night, FernGully: The Last Rainforest), sheet timer (Bobby's World, Aaahh!!! Real Monsters, The Simpsons, Duckman, Jumanji, Dora the Explorer, Cartoon Network Studios, Rocko's Modern Life: Static Cling, Amphibia) and director (Pepper Ann, God, the Devil and Bob, Nickelodeon Animation Studio, Mickey Mouse Clubhouse, We Bare Bears, We Baby Bears).
 July 28: Brianne Leary, American actress, inventor and television writer (co-creator of Stickin' Around).

August
 August 3: Kathleen Quaife-Hodge, American animator (Walt Disney Animation Studios, Sullivan Bluth Studios, Universal Cartoon Studios, FernGully: The Last Rainforest, The Thief and the Cobbler, Asterix in America, The Pagemaster, Warner Bros. Feature Animation, Hanna-Barbera, Nickelodeon Animation Studio, God, the Devil and Bob, The Proud Family, I Want a Dog for Christmas, Charlie Brown, Mickey, Donald, Goofy: The Three Musketeers, Da Boom Crew, Bah, Humduck! A Looney Tunes Christmas, Slacker Cats), (d. 2021).
 August 7: Paul Dini, American screenwriter (Warner Bros. Animation).
 August 13: David Lewman, American television writer (3-South, Drawn Together, George of the Jungle, Yin Yang Yo!, Spaceballs: The Animated Series, Kick Buttowski: Suburban Daredevil, Fresh Beat Band of Spies, Rolling with the Ronks!).
 August 18: Denis Leary, American actor and comedian (voice of Diego in the Ice Age franchise, Francis in A Bug's Life, himself in The Simpsons episode "Lost Verizon").
 August 19: Tom McLaughlin, American animator (Eureeka's Castle), storyboard artist (The Adventures of the Galaxy Rangers, Duckman, Jumanji, DIC Entertainment), sheet timer (Warner Bros. Animation, BattleTech: The Animated Series, Aaahh!!! Real Monsters, Teenage Mutant Ninja Turtles, Iznogoud, Dino Babies, Darkstalkers, Biker Mice from Mars, Bureau of Alien Detectors, X-Men: The Animated Series, Men in Black: The Series, The Legend of Tarzan, DIC Entertainment, Cartoon Network Studios, Pet Alien, Wolverine and the X-Men, Avengers Assemble, Kaijudo), director (Space Strikers, Jumanji, Silver Surfer) and producer (Silver Surfer), (d. 2013).
 August 25: Simon McBurney, English actor, playwright, and theatrical director (voice of Oliver Cromwell in Wolfwalkers).
 August 26: R.J. Colleary, American television producer and writer (Coconut Fred's Fruit Salad Island, The Fairly OddParents, Bunsen Is a Beast).
 August 28: Daniel Stern, American actor, artist, director and screenwriter (voice of the title character in Dilbert, Mr. Packenham in the Hey Arnold! episode "Teachers Strike", narrator in the Family Guy episode "Fox-y Lady" and The Simpsons episode "Three Men and a Comic Book").

September
 September 1: Roy Meurin, Canadian animator (Nelvana, Asterix and the Big Fight, An American Tail: Fievel Goes West, FernGully: The Last Rainforest, Cool World, The Thief and the Cobbler, The Critic, Walt Disney Animation Studios, The Iron Giant, The Tigger Movie, Rugrats Go Wild), storyboard artist (Nelvana, Disney Television Animation, Nickelodeon Animation Studio, Alvin and the Chipmunks, The Swan Princess, The Simpsons, Hyperion Pictures, Rugrats, The Hunchback of Notre Dame II, Jakers! The Adventures of Piggley Winks, Clifford's Puppy Days, Curious George, Duncanville), sheet timer (Rugrats, The Tigger Movie) and director (The Care Bears Family, Rugrats, Rocko's Modern Life).
 September 12: Hans Zimmer, German composer (The Lion King, DreamWorks Animation, The Simpsons Movie, Rango, The SpongeBob Movie: Sponge on the Run).
 September 13: Nicolas Carr, American composer and music editor (DIC Entertainment, Marvel Productions, Saban Entertainment, Disney Television Animation, She-Ra: Princess of Power, Little Dracula, ¡Mucha Lucha!, SpongeBob SquarePants, Camp Lazlo, Action League Now!).
 September 15: Brad Bird, American film director, animator, screenwriter, producer and voice actor (The Simpsons, The Iron Giant, Pixar).
 September 19: Russell Velázquez, Puerto Rican-born American actor (voice of Captain Chaser in One Piece, additional voices in Team Umizoomi) and composer (4Kids Entertainment, Play with Me Sesame, Sesame Street).
 September 26: Bob Staake, American cartoonist, illustrator, author, character designer (The Ren & Stimpy Show, Dexter's Laboratory, Oh Yeah! Cartoons, Samurai Jack) and storyboard artist (Dexter's Laboratory).
 September 30: Fran Drescher, American actress, comedian, writer, activist and trade union leader (voice of Pearl in Shark Bait, Eunice in Hotel Transylvania, Female Golem in The Simpsons episode "Treehouse of Horror XVII", Arlene Stein in the Glenn Martin, DDS episode "Dad News Bears", The Empress in the Planet Sheen episode "Nightmare Sheenario", Encyclopedia in The 7D episode "Once in a Purple Moon", Barbara Wasserman in the Welcome to the Wayne episode "Welcome to the Wassermans").

October
 October 5: Bernie Mac, American actor and comedian (voice of Fruit Juice in Lil' Pimp, Gadgetmobile in Inspector Gadget's Biggest Caper Ever, Zuba in Madagascar: Escape 2 Africa, Mack in the King of the Hill episode "Racist Dawg"), (d. 2008).
 October 6: Bill Fagerbakke, American actor and comedian (voice of Patrick Star in the SpongeBob SquarePants franchise, Broadway in Gargoyles, Polar Bear in The Madagascar Penguins in a Christmas Caper, Frosty the Snowman in The Legend of Frosty the Snowman, Scarecrow in Dorothy and the Wizard of Oz, Bulkhead in Transformers: Animated, Ronnie Raymond in Batman: The Brave and the Bold, the Ghost of Christmas Present in the DuckTales episode "Last Christmas!").
 October 10: 
 David Lodge, American actor (voice of Jiraiya in Naruto, Igor in Persona 5: The Animation, Kaztano in Durarara!!, Kenpachi Zaraki in Bleach, Tharok in Legion of Super Heroes, Calythos in the Justice League Action episode "Power Outage").
 Rumiko Takahashi, Japanese manga artist (Inuyasha, Urusei Yatsura, Ranma 1/2).
 October 24: John Kassir, American actor and comedian (voice of the Cryptkeeper in Tales from the Cryptkeeper, Ray Rocket in Rocket Power, Zombozo in Ben 10, Henchrat in Earthworm Jim, Alfred Nobel, Rasputin, and Thomas Jefferson in Time Squad, Scrooge McDuck in Mickey Mouse and The Wonderful World of Mickey Mouse, Pete Puma in The Looney Tunes Show, continued voice of Buster Bunny in Tiny Toon Adventures).
 October 25: Nancy Cartwright, American voice actress (voice of Bart Simpson, Nelson Muntz, Ralph Wiggum and other various characters in The Simpsons, Mindy in Animaniacs, Fawn Deer in Raw Toonage and Bonkers, Rufus in Kim Possible, Gloria Glad in Richie Rich,  Pistol in Goof Troop, Bright Eyes in Pound Puppies, Toon Shoe in Who Framed Roger Rabbit, continued voice of Chuckie Finster in Rugrats).
 October 29: Dan Castellaneta, American voice actor (voice of Homer Simpson, Grampa Simpson, Barney Gumble, Krusty the Clown, Sideshow Mel, Groundskeeper Willie, Mayor Quimby, and other various characters in The Simpsons, Megavolt in Darkwing Duck, the title character in Earthworm Jim, Grandpa Phil in Hey Arnold!, Earl in Cow and Chicken, Robot Devil in Futurama, Mr. Thickley in Taz-Mania, continued voice of Genie in the Aladdin franchise).
 October 30: Rochelle Linder, American office manager (Family Guy, American Dad!, The Cleveland Show), (d. 2017).

November
 November 3: Dolph Lundgren, Swedish actor and martial artist (voice of Svengeance in Minions: The Rise of Gru, himself in the Sanjay and Craig episode "Huggle Day").
 November 6: Cam Clarke, American actor (voice of Leonardo and Rocksteady in Teenage Mutant Ninja Turtles, Snoopy in Snoopy!!! The Musical, Heath Burns in the Monster High franchise, Whirly Bird in Special Agent Oso, He-Man in He-Man and the Masters of the Universe, Simba in Timon & Pumbaa and House of Mouse, Die Fledermaus in The Tick, Mr. Fantastic in Spider-Man, Doc Samson in The Avengers: Earth's Mightiest Heroes).
 November 10: George Lowe, American voice actor and comedian (voice of Space Ghost in Space Ghost Coast to Coast and Cartoon Planet, Dad in The Brak Show).
 November 18: Joey Miyashima, American actor (voice of Toshiro in The Simpsons episode "One Fish, Two Fish, Blowfish, Blue Fish", additional voices in The Karate Kid).
 November 19: Ofra Haza, Israeli singer, actress, recording artist, writer and journalist (voice of Yocheved and performed the song "Deliver Us" in The Prince of Egypt), (d. 2000).
 November 22: Mackenzie Gray, Canadian actor (voice of Obadiah Stane in Iron Man: Armored Adventures, Rick in Barbie: Thumbelina).
 November 26: Darrell McNeil, American animator, writer, editor, publisher, producer and actor (Hanna-Barbera, Filmation, Ralph Bakshi, Ruby-Spears, Walt Disney Company, Warner Bros. Animation, Don Bluth), (d. 2018).

December
 December 2: Gil Alkabetz, Israeli animator, writer, producer and director (Bitz Butz, Swamp, Yankale, Rubicon, Travel to China, Trim Time, Morir de amor, Ein sonniger Tag, Wollmond, Der Da Vinci Timecode, 1 + 1, One Stormy Night, designed the animated scenes for Run Lola Run), (d. 2022).
 December 9: Donny Osmond, American dancer, singer, television host, and former teen idol (singing voice of Li Shang in Mulan, voiced himself in The Osmonds and Johnny Bravo).
 December 10: Michael Clarke Duncan, American actor (voice of Tug in Brother Bear and Brother Bear 2, Big Daddy in The Land Before Time XI: Invasion of the Tinysauruses, Future Wade in Kim Possible: A Sitch in Time, Massive in Loonatics Unleashed, Elder Marley in Delgo, Commander Vachir in Kung Fu Panda, Guardian Cat in the Fish Hooks episode "Labor of Love", Groot in the Ultimate Spider-Man episode "Guardians of the Galaxy", Kingpin in the Spider-Man: The New Animated Series episode "Royal Scam", Coach Webb in the King of the Hill episode "The Son Also Roses", Mongo in The Proud Family episode "Smackmania 6: Mongo vs. Mama's Boy", Rashid "The Rocket" Randell in the Static Shock episode "Linked", Rockwell in The Fairly OddParents episode "Crash Nebula", Krall in the Teen Titans episode "Cyborg the Barbarian"), (d. 2012).
 December 11:
 William Joyce, American writer, producer, director, illustrator and filmmaker (Walt Disney Animation Studios, Pixar).
 Carlos Meglia, Argentine animator and comics artist (Hanna-Barbera), (d. 2008).
 December 12: Jon Kenny, Irish comedian and actor (voice of Ferry Dan and The Great Seanachaí in Song of the Sea, Stringy Woodcutter in Wolfwalkers).
 December 13: Steve Buscemi, American actor (voice of Randall Boggs in Monsters, Inc. and Monsters University, Neil Fleming in Final Fantasy: The Spirits Within, Wesley in Home on the Range, Horace Nebbercracker in Monster House, Scamper in Igor, Wayne in the Hotel Transylvania franchise, Francis Francis in The Boss Baby, Dwight in The Simpsons episode "I Don't Wanna Know Why the Caged Bird Sings", Tom Innocenti in the Bob's Burgers episode "Sexy Dance Healing", Dorsal Dan in the SpongeBob SquarePants episode "The Getaway", Saloso in the Elena of Avalor episode "The Tides of Change", Eddie in the Rick and Morty episode "A Rickconvenient Mort", himself in The Simpsons episode "Brake My Wife, Please" and the Scooby-Doo and Guess Who? episode "Fear of the Fire Beast!").
 December 21: Ray Romano, American actor and comedian (voice of Manny in the Ice Age franchise, Ray in Dr. Katz, Professional Therapist, Ray Magini in The Simpsons episode "Don't Fear the Roofer").
 December 28: Yoshiji Kigami, Japanese director (MUNTO), animator (Akira, A Silent Voice), and member of Kyoto Animation, (d. 2019).
 December 29: Brad Grey, American producer (Sammy), (d. 2017).
 December 30: Matt Lauer, American former television news personality (voice of Hark Hanson in Curious George 2: Follow That Monkey!, himself in the Father of the Pride episode "Larry's Debut and Sweet Darryl Hannah Too").

Specific date unknown
 J.R. Williams, American cartoonist, animator, and fine artist (Will Vinton Studios).
 Rick Jones, Canadian voice actor, voice director, writer and content developer.
 Richard McGuire, American illustrator, comic book artist, author and musician (created Dash and Dot for PBS Kids).

Deaths

February
 February 5: Ben Hardaway, American animator (Looney Tunes, credited with inspiring the name and one of the earliest model sheets of Bugs Bunny, also worked for Walter Lantz), dies at age 61.

March
 March 1: A.C. Hutchison, American comics artist and animator (Keene Cartoon Corporation, Lee-Bradford Corporation, Ted Eshbaugh Studios, Walt Disney Company), dies at age 72.

April
 April 3: Ned Sparks, Canadian actor (voice of Heckle and Jeckle from 1947 to 1951), dies at age 73.

May
 May 16: John Brown, British actor (voice of Umpire in Make Mine Music, Noah Webster in Symphony in Slang, the narrator, Pee Wee and the theatrical agent in Dixieland Droopy), dies at age 53.

June
 June 21: Kay Nielsen, Danish-American painter, illustrator and animator (Fantasia), dies at age 71.

November
 November 4: Norm Ferguson, American animator (Walt Disney Company, designed Peg-Leg Pete, the Big Bad Wolf and Pluto), dies at age 55 from a heart attack.
 November 21: Bob Amsberry, American actor (voiced one of Maleficent's Goons in Sleeping Beauty), dies in a car accident at age 29.

See also
List of anime by release date (1946–1959)

References

Sources

External links 
Animated works of the year, listed in the IMDb

 
1957